Dylan Meyer (born July 10, 1995) is an American professional golfer from Evansville, Indiana. He attended the University of Illinois before turning professional in 2018. As an amateur, he won the Western Amateur and is a two-time winner of the 3M Augusta Invitational. He made his professional debut at the 2018 U.S. Open.

Early life and education

Meyer began golfing at the age of 5 and would regularly practice with his father, Darren Meyer. He played baseball, basketball, and golf when he was younger, giving up the former two in favor of golf by the time he was 10. He attended Evansville Central High School before playing golf at the University of Illinois.

Amateur career
At Central High School, Meyer earned medalist honors by going undefeated during his senior year. He finished third in the state finals and also recorded the lowest score for the local Courier & Press Men's City title. While at the University of Illinois, Meyer won the 2016 Western Amateur by beating Sam Horsfield 3&1. He also won the 3M Augusta Invitational in 2017, earning a sponsor exemption to the 2018 Valspar Championship. He played in the Valspar Championship as an amateur, making the cut and finishing at 74th. This was his third professional tournament played as an amateur, previously finished T-63 at the 2017 Lincoln Land Charity Championship on the Web.com Tour and missing the cut at the 2017 John Deere Classic. His final win as an amateur came in 2018 when he defended his title at the 3M Augusta Invitational. Overall, Meyer won six college tournaments.

Professional career
Meyer began his professional career at the 2018 U.S. Open where he made the cut and finished 20th overall. During the 2018–19 season, he played in five events on the PGA Tour, with his best finish tied for 7th at the Sanderson Farms Championship and also played on the Korn Ferry Tour.

Amateur wins
2014 OFCC Fighting Illini Invite
2016 Western Amateur
2017 3M Augusta Invitational, Robert Kepler Invitational, Big Ten Championship, Tavistock Collegiate Invitational
2018 3M Augusta Invitational

Source:

Results in major championships
Results not in chronological order before 2019 and in 2020.

CUT = missed the half-way cut
"T" indicates a tie for a place
NT = No tournament due to COVID-19 pandemic

References

External links 
 
 

American male golfers
Illinois Fighting Illini men's golfers
Sportspeople from Evansville, Indiana
1995 births
Living people